Key is an English and Dutch-language surname. Notable people with the surname include:

Al Key (1905-1976), aviator and mayor of Meridian, Mississippi
Adriaen Thomasz Key (c. 1544 – after 1589), Flemish painter
Alexander Key (1904–1979), American science fiction writer
Arden Key (born 1996), American football player
Bailie Key (born 1999), American artistic gymnast, 2013 National Champion
Berthold Wells Key (1895–1986), British Indian Army officer
cEvin Key (born 1961), Canadian musician
Dana Key (1953–2010), American musician
Danny Key, English footballer
David M. Key (1824–1900), US Senator from Tennessee 
David McK. Key (1900–1988), diplomat from Tennessee
Devon Key (born 1997), American football player
Ellen Key (1849–1926), Swedish difference feminist writer 
Francis Scott Key (1779–1843), author of the United States national anthem
Fred Key (1909-1971), Aviator
James L. Key (1867–1939), lawyer and twice Mayor of Atlanta, Georgia
Jimmy Key (born 1961), James Edward Key, former left-handed pitcher in Major League Baseball 
John Key (born 1961), former Prime Minister of New Zealand
Sir John Key, 1st Baronet (1794–1858), Lord Mayor of London 1830–1832, MP for City of London 1832–1833
John A. Key (1871–1954), American politician
 John Maurice Key (1905–1984), Bishop of Sherborne then Truro
John Ross Key (1754–1821), American lawyer and judge
Johnny Key (disambiguation)
Kathleen Key (1903–1954), American actress in the silent era, great-great granddaughter of Francis Scott Key
Keegan-Michael Key (born 1971), American actor, writer, and comedian
Kelly Key (born 1983),  Kelly de Almeida Afonso Freitas, Portuguese-Brazilian pop singer
Kristin Key (born 1980), American comedian
Laurence Key (1895–1971), English cricketer
Lieven de Key (1560—1627), Dutch renaissance architect
Philip Key (U.S. politician), a Representative of the State of Maryland in the United States Congress from 1791 to 1792.
Philip Barton Key (U.S. politician), a Representative of the State of Maryland in the United States Congress from 1807 to 1812.
Philip Barton Key (U.S. District Attorney), murder victim in a controversial nineteenth-century trial 
Robert Key (cricketer) (born 1979), English cricketer
Robert Key (politician) (born 1945), a British politician, the Conservative MP for Salisbury
Ryan Key (born 1979), William Ryan Key, American rock musician of the pop punk band Yellowcard
 Samuel M. Key (born 1951), pen name of Charles de Lint, Canadian writer of Dutch origin
Stephanie Key (born 1954), Australian politician and member of the South Australian House of Assembly
Ted Key (1912–2008), Theodore Keyser, American cartoonist and writer, creator of the cartoon panel Hazel
Thomas Key (disambiguation), several people with the same name
Tim Key (born 1976), English actor, writer, and performance poet
V. O. Key, Jr. (1908–1963), American political scientist and author
Wilhelmine Key (1872-1955), American geneticist

See also
Key (disambiguation)
Keys (surname)
Keyes (disambiguation)

English-language surnames